Sigitas Olberkis (born 19 April 1997) is a Lithuanian professional footballer who plays as a centre-back for lituanian FA Šiauliai.

Career

FK Jelgava
Olberkis signed for FK Jelgava in March 2018, but left the club at the end of the year.

In the first half of the 2019 season, he was member of FK Žalgiris.

References

External links 
 
 

1997 births
Living people
Lithuanian footballers
Lithuanian expatriate footballers
Association football defenders
FC Šiauliai players
FK Panevėžys players
FC Dnepr Mogilev players
FK Jelgava players
FK Žalgiris players
Senglea Athletic F.C. players
Sligo Rovers F.C. players
Tallinna JK Legion players
Dalkurd FF players
A Lyga players
Latvian Higher League players
Belarusian Premier League players
Maltese Premier League players
League of Ireland players
Meistriliiga players
Superettan players
Lithuanian expatriate sportspeople in Belarus
Lithuanian expatriate sportspeople in Latvia
Lithuanian expatriate sportspeople in Malta
Lithuanian expatriate sportspeople in Ireland
Lithuanian expatriate sportspeople in Estonia
Lithuanian expatriate sportspeople in Sweden
Expatriate footballers in Belarus
Expatriate footballers in Latvia
Expatriate footballers in Malta
Expatriate association footballers in the Republic of Ireland
Expatriate footballers in Estonia
Expatriate footballers in Sweden